George W. Lehr (March 10, 1937 – March 21, 1988) was an American Democratic politician from Missouri who served as the state's auditor from 1975 to 1977.

He was born in Kirksville, Missouri in 1937. After graduating from the University of Iowa with a degree in accounting, he was appointed auditor of Jackson County, Missouri in 1963. He was elected county executive from 1971 to 1974. During his watch the County built the Truman Sports Complex. In 1974, Lehr was elected Missouri auditor by a margin of 73,000, defeating John Ashcroft. He became the first certified public accountant to serve as State Auditor, but he surprisingly resigned as Auditor and left politics in 1977 to spend more time with his family and terminally ill son, George Lehr who had muscular dystrophy.

Lehr is credited with helping to clean up the scandal-plagued Teamsters Union Central States pension fund. He had also been the president of the Empire Bank and Trust Company in Kansas City and later was chairman and chief executive officer of Traders Bank.

At the time of his death he had had inoperable brain tumors for more than a year.

References 
 Kirkpatrick, James C. "Official Manual State of Missouri, 1975-1976"

State Auditors of Missouri
University of Iowa alumni
American bankers
County executives of Jackson County, Missouri
Missouri Democrats
1937 births
1988 deaths
People from Kirksville, Missouri
20th-century American businesspeople
20th-century American politicians